Mount Olive Municipal Airport is an airport serving eastern North Carolina. The airport  hosts private and corporate aircraft. The Airport can handle a wheel bearing intensity of 47,500 pounds. There are no military landing fees, and the military does have landing rights. There also is no non-commercial landing fee at the airport.

The airport has a terminal building with pilot amenities . The owner is the city of Mount Olive. The surface is a hard asphalt surface of 5,251 ft.

References

External links
Wpbum.com

Airports in North Carolina
Buildings and structures in Wayne County, North Carolina
Transportation in Wayne County, North Carolina